Thomas Julian Ahrens (25 April 1936 – 24 November 2010) was a Professor of Geophysics at Caltech who was known for his study of the terrestrial planets and impact processes on planetary surfaces. Ahrens died on November 24, 2010 at the age of 74.

Education
B.S., Massachusetts Institute of Technology, 1957; M.S., Caltech, 1958; Ph.D., Rensselaer Polytechnic Institute, 1962.

Career
Geophysicist, Pan American Petroleum Corporation, from 1958 to 1959; Second Lieutenant, U.S. Army, Ballistics Research Laboratory, 1959–60.

Geophysicist, Head Geophysics Section, Poulter Laboratory, Stanford Research Institute, 1962-67. He was hired and worked for Thomas Poulter.

Associate Professor of Geophysics, Caltech, 1967–76; Professor, 1976–2004; W. M. Keck Foundation Professor of Earth Sciences, 1996–2001; Jones Professor, 2004–05; Jones Professor Emeritus, 2005-2010.

Awards and honours
Ahrens was awarded the AAAS Newcomb Cleveland Prize in 1984 along with co-authors Sally M. Rigden and Edward M. Stolper for a report "Densities of Liquid Silicates at High Pressures," Science 30 November 1984. He was elected to the National Academy of Sciences in 1992, and received the Harry H. Hess Award in 1996.

The iron-rich endmember of the γ-olivine solid solution series, γ-Fe2SiO4, was named ahrensite in his honour in 2013.

See also 
List of geophysicists

References

1936 births
2010 deaths
American geophysicists
California Institute of Technology faculty
Massachusetts Institute of Technology alumni
Rensselaer Polytechnic Institute alumni
Members of the United States National Academy of Sciences
SRI International people
United States Army officers